Fluoroantimonic acid is a mixture of hydrogen fluoride and antimony pentafluoride, containing various cations and anions (the simplest being  and ). This substance is a superacid that can be over a billion times stronger than 100% sulfuric acid in terms of its protonating ability measured by Hammett function. It even protonates some hydrocarbons to afford pentacoordinate carbocations (carbonium ions). Fluoroantimonic acid is corrosive. For example, it cannot be contained directly in glass carboys, as it attacks glass, but can be stored in containers lined with PTFE (Teflon) or PFA polymers.

Chemical composition 
Fluoroantimonic acid is formed by combining hydrogen fluoride and antimony pentafluoride:
SbF5 + 2 HF   + H2F+

The speciation (i.e., the inventory of components) of "fluoroantimonic acid" is complex.  Spectroscopic measurements show that fluoroantimonic acid consists of a mixture of HF-solvated protons, [ (such as ), and SbF5-adducts of fluoride, [(SbF5)nF]– (such as ). Thus, the formula "" is a convenient but oversimplified approximation of the true composition.  Nevertheless, the extreme acidity of this mixture is evident from the exceptionally poor proton-accepting ability of the species present in solution. Hydrogen fluoride, a weak acid in aqueous solution that is normally not thought to have any appreciable Brønsted basicity at all, is in fact the strongest Brønsted base in the mixture, protonating to H2F+ in the same way water protonates to H3O+ in aqueous acid.  As a result, the acid is often said to contain "naked protons", though the "free" protons are, in fact, always bonded to hydrogen fluoride molecules. It is the fluoronium ion that accounts for fluoroantimonic acid's extreme acidity.  The protons easily migrate through the solution, moving from H2F+ to HF, when present, by the Grotthuss mechanism.

Two related products have been crystallized from HF-SbF5 mixtures, and both have been analyzed by single crystal X-ray crystallography. As mentioned above,  is weakly basic; the larger anion  is expected to be a still weaker base.

Acidity 
Fluoroantimonic acid is the strongest superacid based on the measured value of its Hammett acidity function (H0), which has been determined for various ratios of HF:SbF5. The H0 of HF is −15.  A solution of HF containing 1 mol % of SbF5 is −20. The H0 is −21 for 10 mol%.  For > 50 mol % SbF5, the H0  is between −21 and −23. The lowest attained H0 is about -28. The following H0 values show that fluoroantimonic acid is stronger than other superacids. Increased acidity is indicated by smaller (in this case, more negative) values of H0.
 Fluoroantimonic acid (−23 < H0 < −28)
 Magic acid (H0  = −23)
 Carborane acid (H0  < −18)
 Fluorosulfuric acid (H0  = −15)
 Triflic acid (H0  = −15)
 Perchloric acid (H0 = -13)

Of the above, only the carborane acids, whose H0 could not be directly determined due to their high melting points, may be stronger acids than fluoroantimonic acid.

The H0 value measures the protonating ability of the bulk, liquid acid, and this value has been directly determined or estimated for various compositions of the mixture.  The pKa on the other hand, measures the equilibrium of proton dissociation of a discrete chemical species when dissolved in a particular solvent. Since fluoroantimonic acid is not a single chemical species, its pKa value is not well-defined.

The gas-phase acidity (GPA) of individual species present in the mixture have been calculated using density functional theory methods.  (Solution-phase pKas of these species can, in principle, be estimated by taking into account solvation energies, but do not appear to be reported in the literature as of 2019.)  For example, the ion-pair  [H2F]+· was estimated to have a GPA of 254 kcal/mol.  For comparison, the commonly encountered superacid triflic acid, TfOH, is a substantially weaker acid by this measure, with a GPA of 299 kcal/mol.  However, certain carborane superacids have GPAs lower than that of [H2F]+·.  For example, H(CHB11Cl11) has an experimentally determined GPA of 241 kcal/mol.

Reactions 
Fluoroantimonic acid is so reactive that it is challenging to identify media with which it is unreactive.  Materials compatible with fluoroantimonic acid as a solvent include SO2ClF, and sulfur dioxide; some chlorofluorocarbons have also been used. Containers for HF/SbF5 are made of PTFE.

Fluoroantimonic acid decomposes when heated, generating free hydrogen fluoride gas and liquid antimony pentafluoride at a temperature of 40 °C.

As a superacid, fluoroantimonic acid protonates nearly all organic compounds, often causing dehydrogenation, or dehydration. In 1967, Bickel and Hogeveen showed that 2HF·SbF5 will remove H2 from isobutane and methane from neopentane to form carbenium ions:
(CH3)3CH + H+ → (CH3)3C+ + H2
(CH3)4C + H+ → (CH3)3C+ + CH4
It is also used in the synthesis of tetraxenonogold complexes.

Safety
HF/SbF5 is a highly corrosive substance that reacts violently with water. Heating fluoroantimonic acid is dangerous as well, as it decomposes into toxic hydrogen fluoride gas. The main method of containment involves storage in a PTFE container as it dissolves glass and many other materials.

See also
Fluoroboric acid
Fluorosulfuric acid
Hexafluorophosphoric acid

References

Antimony(V) compounds
Fluoro complexes
Inorganic compounds
Superacids
Mineral acids
Ionic liquids